Kaziranga National Park is an Indian national park and an UNESCO World Heritage Site situated in the Golaghat and Nagaon district of Assam, India. It is a tourist destination and conservation area particularly notable as a refuge for the endangered Indian one-horned rhinoceros (Rhinoceros unicornis), hosting the largest population of wild Indian one-horned Rhinoceros in the world. The park contains significant stock of three other large herbivores — the Asian Elephant, the Asiatic Water Buffalo and the eastern subspecies of the Swamp Deer. Kaziranga also has the highest density of tiger in the world and is declared a Tiger Reserve in 2006. Kaziranga is recognized as an Important Bird Area by Birdlife International for conservation of avifaunal species.

Tourist activities
The means of travel inside the park is on the back of trained elephants with mahout guides, or in Jeep or 4WD vehicles. Most rides are booked in advance and depart from the Park Administrative Centre in Kohora. The Park has three tourist routes under the jurisdiction of three Ranges — Kohora, Bagori and Agaratoli. These roads are open to light vehicles from November to mid May. The park remains closed from mid-April to mid-October due to monsoon. Visitors willing to view wild life by motorcars are guided through these roads by the staff of this department. The visitors are allowed to take in their own vehicles, however no visitor is allowed to enter the park without an accompanying representative of the forest department. Observation towers are situated at Sohola, Mihimukh, Kathpara, Foliamari and Harmoti for spotting wildlife. Wildlife watching, including birding is the main activity inside the park. Viewing the scenic landscape of the park with different vegetation types interspersed with numerous beels and the snow-covered mountains of Himalayas at a distance constitute other attractions. Hiking in the park is not allowed taking into consideration the large number of potentially dangerous wild animals. An interpretation centre is being set up at the Bagori range of Kaziranga, to help the visitors know everything about the park.

Lodging
The park has a wide range of accommodation including rest houses, dormitory and lodges maintained by the Department of Environment and Forests, Government of Assam and the India Tourism Development Corporation. At present there are four Government tourist lodges of different categories at Kohora and three tourist lodges inside the park. Numerous private hotels are also available outside the borders of the park.

List Of Hotels at Kaziranga National Park -

 Iora Resort
 Bonhabi Resort
 Green Reed Resort
 Wild Grass Lodge
 Camp Rhino Resort
 Dhanshree Resort
 Arranya Resort
 Bonani Lodge
 Sneha Bhawan
 United 21 Grassland Resort
 Borgos Resort
 Landmark Woods
 Diphlu River Lodge
 Sarmah Lodge
 Deuta's Cottage
 Infinity Kaziranga Wilderness
 Agoratoli Resort
 Arimora Guest House
 T G Resort
 Joonaki Kareng
 Prayag Emarald

Transportation

The main gate for Kaziranga, at Kohora is on the National Highway 37 (NH 37). Assam State Transport Corporation and private buses stop here on their way to and from Guwahati, Tezpur and Upper Assam. Taxi Services also available from Guwahati to Kaziranga National Park and other places in Assam. The park is a 4-hour drive from Guwahati on the NH-37 and 1.5 hrs from Nagaon. Both these cities are well connected to the park by buses and taxies. Furkating ( away) is the nearest railway station, other important stations are Nagaon, Jorhat and Guwahati (GHY) stations. The nearest town from the park is Bokakhat ( away) and the nearest cities are Nagaon, Tezpur and Guwahati.

Employment
Tourism benefits the people living in the fringe of the park and helps in empowering the local people. About 35 hotels or lodges of various kinds located just outside the park, out of these, four are run by the government.
A total of 299 local people are actively employed in these hotels. But, a very few hotels/lodges are owned by the local people. However, some families are offering home stay facilities just outside the park, so that the tourist may get a taste of the local life. People from the adjoining areas own 70 vehicles, which are allowed to be taken into the park, and most of them act as the driver cum guide. On the highway 37, which cuts across the park, 12 local community members own and run public phone booths. There are also 26 shops selling souvenirs etc. that are owned and/or managed by local community members. Many local women also regularly perform traditional dances at some of the larger hotels. Many sell locally handmade woven cloth to the tourist, which act as a money churner. There is tremendous scope for the sale of handicrafts in and around the park. Existing Self Help Groups (SHG) could very well provide a platform for such mechanisms. The Ministry of Tourism, Government of India along with the United Nations Development Programme (UNDP) are jointly supporting rural tourism in village of Durgapur, which falls in the periphery of the Kohora range of  Kaziranga along with other initiatives at 31 sites across India.

Local people do get some amount of employment from the park in the form of labour and allied activities. Labour requirements for the park include, labour for anti poaching activities and construction of bridges, culverts, etc. Approximately 100 to 200 people are hired per range for removal of Mimosa, a weed which is harmful for the herbivores. The park authorities have also hired 15 local people as security guard to protect the tourist jeeps inside the park.  The park has developed a very good network of intelligence throughout the villages surrounding the park. There are key informants in every village, which reports about the movement of poachers and are monetarily compensated for information they provide to the park authorities.

References

List of Hotels - 

Tourism in Assam
Kaziranga National Park